George Dale Derby (September 25, 1948 – August 24, 2021) was an American politician who served in the Oklahoma House of Representatives from the 74th district from 2017 to 2019.

Early life and career
George Dale Derby was born on September 25, 1948 in Eldon, Missouri. He later graduated from Claremore High School in Claremore, Oklahoma in 1966. He went on to receive a Bachelor of Science in Biology from the University of Tulsa in 1971 and a Doctor of Osteopathic Medicine from the Kansas City University of Osteopathic Medicine in 1975.

After finishing his degree, he worked in St. Louis at the Normandy Osteopathic Hospital until 1976. After leaving St. Louis, he joined the United States Navy as a lieutenant colonel. He served for three years and spent time in Guam. After leaving the Navy in 1979, Derby spent sixteen years in private practice as a primary care physician in Farmington, Missouri before moving to Fresno, California to serve as chief of an anesthesiology department. In 2004 Derby moved to Owasso, Oklahoma.
Derby started working for Bailey Medical Center in Owasso in 2006.

Oklahoma House of Representatives
Derby ran for one term in the Oklahoma House of Representatives in 2016 to succeed his son, David Derby, to represent the 74th district.
He faced Democratic candidate Jeri Moberly in the general election on November 8, 2016. 
Moberly had been endorsed by the Tulsa World who described Derby as "more of the same."
Derby defeated Moberly in the general election with over two-thirds of the vote.

Oklahoma Speaker of the House Charles McCall later described Derby's time serving in the 56th Oklahoma Legislature saying "As a member of the House, Rep. Dale Derby was a conservative solution seeker who worked with others to address issues of the state."

Return to Medicine and death
After leaving the Oklahoma House of Representatives, Derby worked as an anesthesiologist in Owasso. He served as the medical director of anesthesia and chairman of the board for Bailey Medical Center in Owasso, Oklahoma.

Derby died on August 24, 2021, after he drowned in an accident while on Oologah Lake, near Oologah, Oklahoma at age 72. While out on the lake, Derby attempted to swim out to a drifting boat without a life jacket. While swimming he went under the water and did not resurface. His body was recovered later that day by the Northwest Fire Department.

Electoral History

References

1948 births
2021 deaths
20th-century American physicians
21st-century American physicians
21st-century American politicians
Accidental deaths in Oklahoma
Boating accident deaths
Deaths by drowning in the United States
Republican Party members of the Oklahoma House of Representatives
People from Owasso, Oklahoma
Physicians from Oklahoma